William Jonathan Swan (born 26 October 2000) is an English professional footballer who plays as a forward for  club Mansfield Town, on loan from  club Nottingham Forest. He has previously played on loan at Truro City and Port Vale.

Career

Nottingham Forest
Swan joined the Nottingham Forest academy at the age of 13. On 4 January 2020, Swan joined Southern League Premier Division South side Truro City on a one-month loan and scored two goals on his debut at Treyew Road in a 4–0 win over Metropolitan Police later that day. Manager Paul Wotton said that "he comes from Nottingham Forest with high regard and its a real coup for us". The loan was extended into a second month and Swan went on to score nine goals in as many games for Truro, before returning to Nottingham on 1 March 2020.

After scoring eight goals for Forest's U23 side at the start of the season, Swan began training with Forest's first-team. Manager Chris Hughton gave him his debut in professional football on 29 November 2020, putting him on as a 76th-minute substitute during a 1–0 loss to Swansea City at the City Ground. The following month Swan signed a new contract to keep him at the club until 2024. However his first-team opportunities were limited by the signing of Glenn Murray and return to fitness of Lewis Grabban.

On 1 February 2020, Swan moved on loan to EFL League Two side Port Vale until the end of the 2020–21 season. He scored his first goal in the English Football League on 6 March, during a 3–2 defeat at Cheltenham Town. He played ten matches during his time at Vale Park. He did not play any competitive football during the 2021–22 campaign, though did train with the Forest first-team in March 2022. He finished as top-scorer for the under-23 team, scoring 12 goals in 22 appearances as Andy Reid's side reached the semi-finals of the Premier League 2 Division 2 play-offs.

On 9 July 2022, Swan joined League Two side Mansfield Town – his hometown club – on loan for the 2022–23 season; manager Nigel Clough stated that "he'll bring youth and energy to the team".

Style of play
Swan is a forward with good movement, first touch, awareness and finishing skills.

Career statistics

References

2000 births
Living people
Footballers from Mansfield
English footballers
Association football forwards
Nottingham Forest F.C. players
Truro City F.C. players
Port Vale F.C. players
Mansfield Town F.C. players
Southern Football League players
English Football League players